

The Hobsons Bay Coastal Trail is a shared use path for cyclists and pedestrians, which follows the coast line of Hobsons Bay in the inner western suburbs in Melbourne, Victoria, Australia. The trail forms part of the western half of the Bayside Trail which encircles Port Phillip. It runs from the west side of the Westgate bridge, south and along the coast, finishing at the Skeleton Creek Trail in Sanctuary Lakes.

Following the Path
Towards the Footscray end the path connects with the Maribyrnong River Trail and passes the offices of the Lonely Planet publications.  At this junction cyclists can continue north on the Maribyrnong River Trail or connect to the Footscray Road off-road path which continues directly to the Docklands and the Capital City Trail.

Between Footscray and Spotswood is a 3 metre wide off-road which continues south down Moreland Street, Whitehall Street before turning west down Somerville Road and then south again down Hyde Street for approximately 1 kilometre. Under the West Gate Bridge the 3 metre trail continues south along the banks of the Yarra River for approximately 3 km to Williamstown. From here continuous paths can be followed to Altona.

On weekends a punt takes cyclists across the Yarra River from Spotswood near the Scienceworks Museum.

Connections

In the north is the Maribyrnong River Trail as well as the Footscray Road Path which connects to the Capital City Trail in Docklands. Heading south the trail goes through Williamstown and intersects the lower Kororoit Creek Trail in Altona, then the Laverton Creek Trail. In the south the path terminates at the Skeleton Creek Trail in Altona Meadows.

References 

Bike rides around Melbourne 3rd edition, 2009, Julia Blunden, Open Spaces Publishing,

External links
 Hobsons Bay council maps
 West Gate Punt
 Commute to Lonely Planet
 Hobsons Bay Bicycle User Group

Bike paths in Melbourne
Port Phillip
City of Hobsons Bay